Hauptman is a surname. Notable people with the surname include:

Bruno Hauptmann (1899-1936), perpetrator of the Lindbergh kidnapping
Herbert A. Hauptman (1917-2011), mathematician and winner of the 1985 Nobel Prize in Chemistry
Judith Hauptman (born 1943), feminist Jewish Talmudic scholar
William Hauptman (born 1942), writer

See also
Hauptmann, a German military rank